Norman Hindsley (February 11, 1886 –  January 30, 1966) was a Canadian politician, accountant and published author from Alberta.

Hindsley was born in Walsall, Staffordshire, England, to Thomas and Lucy Hindsley. He emigrated, arriving in Alberta in 1910.

In 1927, Norman wrote a report Into the Advisability of the Establishment of a Forty-Eight Hour Working Week in Alberta the title was published by the University of Alberta.

Norman Hindsley was elected to the Legislative Assembly of Alberta in a hotly contested 1933 Calgary by-election after the resignation of Harold McGill. The by-election shaped up to be a tight race between Norman and Amelia Turner who ran under a combined Labor/Cooperative Commonwealth banner. Norman edged out Amelia to take the seat.

He served in the legislature until the 1935 Alberta general election as an Independent but did not run for re-election.

References

External links

University of Alberta Libraries, Author Hindsley, Norman
Norman Hindsley 1933 by-election platform

1886 births
1966 deaths
People from Walsall
English emigrants to Canada
Canadian non-fiction writers
Independent Alberta MLAs
20th-century non-fiction writers